This is a list of vetoed United Nations Security Council resolutions regarding the Syrian Civil War.

See also 
List of United Nations resolutions concerning Syria
List of vetoed United Nations Security Council resolutions

References 

Syria
Foreign involvement in the Syrian civil war
Vetoed